The Clorox Company (formerly Clorox Chemical Company) is an American global manufacturer and marketer of consumer and professional products. As of 2020 the Oakland, California based company had approximately 8,800 employees worldwide. Net sales for 2020 fiscal year were US$6.7 billion. Ranked annually since 2000, Clorox was named number 474 on Fortune magazine's 2020 Fortune 500 list.

Clorox products are sold primarily through mass merchandisers, retail outlets, e-commerce channels, distributors, and medical supply providers. Clorox brands include its namesake bleach and cleaning products, as well as Burt's Bees, Formula 409, Glad, Hidden Valley, Kingsford, Kitchen Bouquet, KC Masterpiece, Liquid-Plumr, Brita (in the Americas), Mistolin, Pine-Sol, Poett, Green Works Cleaning Products, Soy Vay, RenewLife, Rainbow Light, Natural Vitality, Neocell, Tilex, S.O.S., and Fresh Step, Scoop Away, and Ever Clean pet products.

History

1913–1927
The Electro-Alkaline Company was founded on May 3, 1913, as the first commercial-scale liquid bleach manufacturer in the United States.  Archibald Taft, a banker; Edward Hughes, a purveyor of wood and coal; Charles Husband, a bookkeeper; Rufus Myers, a lawyer; and William Hussey, a miner, each invested $100 to set up a factory 
on the east side of San Francisco Bay. The name of its original product, Clorox, was coined as a portmanteau of its two main ingredients, chlorine and sodium hydroxide. The original Clorox packaging featured a diamond-shaped logo, which has been used in one form or another in Clorox branding ever since.

The public, however, was unfamiliar with liquid bleach. The company started slowly and was about to collapse when it was taken over by investor William Murray in 1916, who installed himself as general manager. His wife Annie prompted the creation of a less concentrated liquid bleach for home use, and built customer demand by giving away 15-ounce sample bottles at the family's grocery store in downtown Oakland. Word shortly began to spread, and in 1917 the company began shipping Clorox bleach to the East Coast via the Panama Canal.

1928–1960s
On May 28, 1928, the company went public on the San Francisco stock exchange and changed its name to Clorox Chemical Company. Butch, an animated Clorox liquid bleach bottle, was used in its advertising and became well known, even surviving the 1941 transition from rubber-stoppered bottles to screw-off caps.

Clorox was strong enough to survive the Great Depression during the 1930s, achieving national distribution of its bleach.

Even though the bleach was a  valuable first aid product for American armed forces during World War II, government rationing of chlorine gas forced many bleach manufacturers to reduce the concentration of sodium hypochlorite in their products. Clorox, however, declined and elected to sell fewer units of a full-strength bleach, establishing a reputation for quality.

In 1957, Clorox was purchased by Procter & Gamble, which renamed its new subsidiary The Clorox Company. Almost immediately, a rival company objected to the purchase, and it was challenged by the Federal Trade Commission, which feared it would stifle competition in the household products market. The FTC prevailed in 1967 when the U.S. Supreme Court forced Procter & Gamble to divest Clorox, which took place on January 1, 1969.

1970s–1990s
Throughout the 1970s and 1980s, Clorox pursued an aggressive expansion and diversification program. In 1970 it introduced Clorox 2 all-fabric bleach. Later it acquired a number of brands that remain a part of its portfolio, including Formula 409, Liquid-Plumr, and Kingsford charcoal. The company also developed new cleaning products such as Tilex instant mildew remover. It also acquired the  "Hidden Valley" brand of ranch dressing.

In 1988, Clorox struck a licensing-and-distribution agreement that brought Brita water filters to the U.S. The company acquired sole control of the brand for the U.S. and Canada in 1995 when it acquired Brita International Holdings (Canada). In 2000 it secured the remaining Americas market from Brita.

In 1990, Clorox purchased Pine-Sol.

In 1999, Clorox acquired First Brands, the former consumer products division of Union Carbide, in the largest transaction in its history. Such brands as Glad, Handi-Wipes (which First Brands acquired from Colgate-Palmolive several months before the Clorox acquisition) and STP became part of the Clorox portfolio. The First Brands acquisition doubled the size of the company and helped it land on the Fortune 500 for the first time the following year.

2000s–present
In 2002, Clorox entered into a joint venture with Procter & Gamble to create food and trash bags, food wraps, and containers under the names Glad, GladWare and related trademarks. As part of this agreement, Clorox sold a 10% stake in the Glad products to P&G, which increased to 20% in 2005.

In 2007, the company acquired Burt's Bees. In 2010, Clorox shed businesses that were no longer a good strategic fit for the company, announcing that it was selling the Armor All and STP brands to Avista Capital Partners. In 2011, Clorox acquired the Aplicare and HealthLink brands, bolstering its presence in the healthcare industry.

In 2008, The Clorox Company became the first major consumer packaged goods company to develop and nationally launch a green cleaning line, Green Works, into the mainstream cleaning aisle. In 2011, the Clorox Company integrated corporate social responsibility (CSR) reporting with financial reporting. The company's annual report for the fiscal year ending in June 2011 shared data on financial performance as well as advances in environmental, social and governance performance.

In 2013 the company announced a focus on consumer mega trends that included sustainability, health and wellness, affordability/value, and multiculturalism, with a particular focus on the Hispanic community.

In 2015, the company became a signatory of the United Nations Global Compact, a large corporate responsibility initiative.

In 2018 Clorox purchased Nutranext Business, LLC for approximately $700 million. Florida-based Nutranext makes natural multivitamins, specialty minerals used as health aids, and supplements for hair, skin and nails. Operating income in 2018 was US$1.1 billion. With approximately 8,700 employees worldwide as of 2018, yearly revenue for the period ending June 30, 2018, equaled $6.1 billion. Yearly revenue equaled $6.2 billion in 2019.

Clorox was named to the inaugural Bloomberg Gender Equality Index in 2018, then, the following year, it topped the Axios Harris Poll 100 corporate reputation rankings. In 2019, Clorox ranked seventh in Barron's "100 Most Sustainable U.S. Companies" list.

In 2022, the company opened a new manufacturing facility in Martinsburg, West Virginia, to facilitate the growth of its cat litter business.

Brands 

The Clorox Company currently owns a number of well-known household and professional brands across a wide variety of products, among them:

 Brita water filtration systems (Americas only)
 Burt's Bees natural cosmetics and personal care products
 Clorinda: bleach and cleaning and disinfection products, alternative brand of Clorox Chile
 Formula 409 hard surface cleaners
 Fresh Step, Scoop Away and Ever Clean cat litters
 Glad storage bags, trash bags, Press'n Seal, GladWare containers (joint venture with P&G as 20% minority shareholder)
 Green Works natural cleaners
 Handy Andy floor cleaners in Australia
 Hidden Valley dressings, sandwich spreads and condiments, dips and dressing mixes, croutons and salad toppings, side dishes and appetizers
 Kingsford charcoal
 Kitchen Bouquet, KC Masterpiece, and Soy Vay sauces
 Lestoil heavy-duty laundry / multipurpose Cleaner
 Liquid-Plumr drain cleaner
 Natural Vitality
 Neocell dietary supplements
 Pine-Sol, Tilex, Poett and S.O.S cleaning products
 Rainbow Light
 Renew Life digestive health products

The ingredients in Clorox bleach are water, sodium hypochlorite, sodium chloride, sodium carbonate, sodium chlorate, sodium hydroxide and sodium polyacrylate.

For historical reasons, and in certain markets, the company's bleach products are sold under regional brands. In 2006, Clorox acquired the Javex line of bleach products in Canada, and similar product lines in parts of Latin and South America, from Colgate-Palmolive.

Sales
The company ranked No. 453 on the Fortune 500 list in 2017; by 2020, Clorox ranked No. 474 on the list.

Clorox's net sales (2015–2020)

Marketing

Advertising campaigns

In 1986, the advertising campaign for Clorox 2 featured an award-winning jingle, "Mama's Got The Magic of Clorox 2". The song was written by Dan Williams and performed by Dobie Gray.

The company was listed at Advertising Ages 2015 Marketer A-List.

Allegations of sexist marketing

During 2006 and 2007, a Clorox commercial that aired nationally showed several generations of women doing laundry. The commercial included the words "Your mother, your grandmother, her mother, they all did the laundry, maybe even a man or two." Feminists criticized the commercial for insinuating that doing laundry is a job for women only.

The Clorox slogan, "Mama's got the magic of Clorox", was criticized on similar grounds. The slogan first appeared in a Clorox commercial in 1986. A modified version of the commercial ran from 2002 to 2004.

In 2009, Clorox received complaints of sexism for an advertisement that featured a man's white, lipstick-stained dress shirt with the caption, "Clorox. Getting ad guys out of hot water for generations." The ad, and others, were produced expressly for the television program Mad Men, capitalizing on "the show's unique vintage style to [create] a link between classic and modern consumer behaviors."

Reactions to product claims

Green Works
In 2008, the Sierra Club endorsed the Clorox Green Works line. Sierra Club Executive Director Carl Pope stated that one of non-profit organization's "primary goals is to foster vibrant, healthy communities with clean water and air that are free from pollution. Products like Green Works help to achieve this goal in the home." The Sierra Club also partnered with Clorox "to promote a line of natural cleaning products for consumers who are moving toward a greener lifestyle." The partnership "caused schisms" in the club, which contributed in part to Pope's decision to resign.

Also in 2008, the National Advertising Division told Clorox to either discontinue or modify its advertisements for Green Works on the grounds the cleaners actually do not work as well as traditional cleaners, as Clorox had claimed.

In 2009, Clorox received further criticism for its Clorox Green Works line, regarding claims the products are environmentally friendly. Several Clorox Green Works products contain ethanol, which environmental groups state is neither cost-effective nor eco-friendly. Many Green Works products also contain sodium lauryl sulfate, a known skin irritant. Women's Voices for the Earth have questioned whether or not the Clorox Green Works line is greenwashing, as Clorox's "green" products are far outnumbered by their traditional products, asking "Why sell one set of products that have hazardous ingredients and others that don't?"

See also

 List of companies based in Oakland, California

References

External links 

 TheCloroxCompany.com: corporate website
 Clorox.com: consumer products website

 
1913 establishments in California
1960s initial public offerings
American brands
American companies established in 1913
Chemical companies established in 1913
Chemical companies of the United States
Cleaning product brands
Companies listed on the New York Stock Exchange
Manufacturing companies based in Oakland, California
Manufacturing companies established in 1913
Multinational companies headquartered in the United States